Shiva-Shakti is a 1988 Indian action drama film directed by Anand. It starred Shatrughan Sinha, Govinda, Anupam Kher, Kimi Katkar and Anita Raj.

Plot 
Shiva wants to collect money for his sister marriage and goes out of the town. He befriends with Shakti and Shakti falls in love with Shiva's sister Kusum. While she gets pregnant, Shiva vows to kill his friend.

Cast
Shatrughan Sinha as Shiva
Govinda as Shakti
Kimi Katkar as Kusum
Anita Raj as Dolly
Anupam Kher as D. C. 
Gulshan Grover as Jangha
Shiva as Girja
Goga Kapoor as Goga Thakur
Leela Mishra as Rampyari
Ashok Saraf as Karim
Birbal as Gullu
Dinesh Hingoo as Shiva's  Boss
Yunus Parvez as Biharilal
Tiku Talsania as Inspector Waghmare

Songs
"Dekh Le Zara" - Alisha Chinai
"Holi Main Dil Se Dil Mila Lo" - Alka Yagnik & Mohammed Aziz
"Peechha Na Chhodoongi" - Alka Yagnik & Kishore Kumar
"Mehfil Mein Hum Kya Aaye" - Alka Yagnik & Shatrughan Sinha
"Mere Dil Ne Tujhe Chaha" - Kavita Krishnamurthy and Suresh Wadkar
"Mere Dil Ne Tujhe Chaha" (sad) - Kavita Krishnamurthy and Suresh Wadkar
"Teri Tarah To Mehfil Mein" - Alka Yagnik and Kishore Kumar

External links

References

1980s Hindi-language films
1988 films
Films scored by Anand–Milind
Indian action drama films